William Stanley Shepherd (12 March 1910 – 11 October 2002) was a British Conservative politician.

Shepherd was educated at Crewe and worked as a manufacturing chemist and company director and director of the Manchester Chamber of Commerce. He served with the army in France, Belgium and the Netherlands during World War II, reaching the rank of Lieutenant.

Shepherd was elected Member of Parliament for Bucklow at the 1945 general election and for Cheadle from 1950 until 1966, when he was defeated by the Liberal Dr. Michael Winstanley.

In Parliament, Shepherd served as a senior member of the Conservative Parliamentary Committee on Trade and Industry and wrote extensively on industrial and social matters.

He also spoke out against reform of anti-homosexual laws, once stating "The proper way to look at homosexuality is to regard it not as something separate but as something to which any of us can succumb if the circumstances of our lives or the weakness of our outlook make us susceptible."

In the 1980s, he joined the Social Democratic Party.

References

External links 

1910 births
2002 deaths
Royal Army Service Corps officers
Royal Sussex Regiment officers
British Army personnel of World War II
Conservative Party (UK) MPs for English constituencies
UK MPs 1945–1950
UK MPs 1950–1951
UK MPs 1951–1955
UK MPs 1955–1959
UK MPs 1959–1964
UK MPs 1964–1966
Social Democratic Party (UK) politicians
Members of the Parliament of the United Kingdom for Cheadle